Vakha Akhmetovich Albakov (born 17 January 1985) is a Russian professional football coach and a former player.

Club career
He played two seasons in the Russian Football National League for FC Angusht Nazran.

External links
 
 

1985 births
People from Norilsk
Living people
Russian footballers
Association football midfielders
FC Angusht Nazran players
Russian football managers
Sportspeople from Krasnoyarsk Krai